Yohan Marmot (born 22 July 1999) is a footballer who plays as a left-back. Born in metropolitan France, he plays for the French Guiana national team.

Club career
Marmot is a youth academy graduate of Ajaccio. He made his debut for the club on 16 November 2019 in a 3–1 Coupe de France defeat against Saint-Flour.

International career
Marmot made his debut for French Guiana on 2 June 2022 in a 2–0 CONCACAF Nations League win against Guatemala.

Career statistics

International

References

External links
 

1999 births
Living people
Association football defenders
French footballers
French Guianan footballers
French Guiana international footballers
Championnat National players
Championnat National 3 players
AC Ajaccio players
FC Bastia-Borgo players